Mirbozor is an urban-type settlement in Samarkand Region, Uzbekistan. It is part of Narpay District. The town population in 2002 was 5300 people.

References

Populated places in Samarqand Region
Urban-type settlements in Uzbekistan